The World Set Free is a novel written in 1913 and published in 1914 by H. G. Wells. The book is based on a prediction of a more destructive and uncontrollable sort of weapon than the world has yet seen.  It had appeared first in serialised form with a different ending as A Prophetic Trilogy, consisting of three books:  A Trap to Catch the Sun, The Last War in the World and The World Set Free.

Plot
A frequent theme of Wells's work, as in his 1901 nonfiction book Anticipations, was the history of humans' mastery of power and energy through technological advance, seen as a determinant of human progress. The novel begins: "The history of mankind is the history of the attainment of external power. Man is the tool-using, fire-making animal. ... Always down a lengthening record, save for a set-back ever and again, he is doing more." (Many of the ideas Wells develops here found a fuller development when he wrote The Outline of History in 1918–1919.)  The novel is dedicated "To Frederick Soddy's Interpretation of Radium," a volume published in 1909.

Scientists of the time were well aware that the slow natural radioactive decay of elements like radium continues for thousands of years, and that while the rate of energy release is negligible, the total amount released is huge. Wells used this as the basis for his story.
In his fiction,

Wells's knowledge of atomic physics came from reading books by William Ramsay, Ernest Rutherford, and Frederick Soddy; the last discovered the disintegration of uranium.  Soddy's book Wealth, Virtual Wealth and Debt praises The World Set Free.  Wells's novel may even have influenced the development of nuclear weapons, as the physicist Leó Szilárd read the book in 1932, the same year the neutron was discovered. In 1933 Szilárd conceived the idea of neutron chain reaction, and filed for patents on it in 1934.

Wells's "atomic bombs" have no more force than ordinary high explosive  and are rather primitive devices detonated by a "bomb-thrower" biting off "a little celluloid stud."  They consist of "lumps of pure Carolinum" that induce "a blazing continual explosion" whose half-life is seventeen days, so that it is "never entirely exhausted," so that "to this day the battle-fields and bomb fields of that frantic time in human history are sprinkled with radiant matter, and so centres of inconvenient rays."

Wells observes:

Wells viewed war as the inevitable result of the Modern State; the introduction of atomic energy in a world divided resulted in the collapse of society. The only possibilities remaining were "either the relapse of mankind to agricultural barbarism from which it had emerged so painfully or the acceptance of achieved science as the basis of a new social order."  Wells's theme of world government is presented as a solution to the threat of nuclear weapons.

The devastation of the war leads the French ambassador at Washington, Leblanc, to summon world leaders to a conference at Brissago, where Britain's "King Egbert" sets an example by abdicating in favor of a world state.  Such is the state of the world's exhaustion that the effective coup of this "council" ("Never, of course, had there been so provisional a government.  It was of an extravagant illegality.") is resisted only in a few places.  The defeat of Serbia's "King Ferdinand Charles" and his attempt to destroy the council and seize control of the world is narrated in some detail.

Brought to its senses, humanity creates a utopian order along Wellsian lines in short order.  Atomic energy has solved the problem of work.  In the new order "the majority of our population consists of artists."

The World Set Free concludes with a chapter recounting the reflections of one of the new order's sages, Marcus Karenin, during his last days.  Karenin argues that knowledge and power, not love, are the essential vocation of humanity, and that "There is no absolute limit to either knowledge or power."

See also

 archive.org (sign up to access material): The World Set Free
The Shape of Things to Come
 The World State
 Dirty bomb

References

External links

 
 

 The World Set Free, a story of mankind, by H. G. Wells, 1914. (a searchable facsimile at the University of Georgia Libraries; DjVu & layered PDF format)

1914 British novels
Novels by H. G. Wells
1914 science fiction novels
British science fiction novels
Novels set during World War I
Invasion literature
Macmillan Publishers books